Kallakurichi is a state assembly constituency in Tamil Nadu, India. Its State Assembly Constituency number is 80. Located in Kallakurichi district, it consists of a portion of Kallakkurichi taluk. It is a part of the Kallakurichi constituency for national elections to the Parliament of India. It is one of the 234 State Legislative Assembly Constituencies in Tamil Nadu.

Previously in existence for the elections from 1951 to 1971, inclusive, it was converted into Chinnasalem constituency for the 1977 election. It came into existence again for 2011 election following the reorganisation of constituencies in 2007. The seat is reserved for candidates from the Scheduled Castes.

Madras State

Tamil Nadu

Election Results

2021

2016

2011

1971

1967

1962

1957

1952

References 

Assembly constituencies of Tamil Nadu
Viluppuram district